Tim Riley may refer to:
Tim Riley (radio personality), anchor/reporter with AM 860 and KKOV in Portland, Oregon
Tim Riley (music critic), author of books about The Beatles and Bob Dylan
 Tim Riley, member of American Christian music group Gold City